Georgi Petkov Bliznashki (born 4 October 1956) is a Bulgarian politician and a former Member of the European Parliament (MEP). He was a member of the Coalition for Bulgaria, part of the Party of European Socialists, and became and was an MEP from 1 January 2007 to June 2007 with the accession of Bulgaria to the European Union. He was born in Skravena, Sofia Oblast.

Expulsion from Socialist Party
Bliznashki was expelled from the BSP in March 2014 after he expressed disagreement with party policy. On 6 August 2014 he was appointed to serve as a caretaker Prime Minister of Bulgaria. The Bliznashki Government ended with the election of a new government two months later.

See also
Bliznashki Government

References

External links
 European Parliament profile
 European Parliament official photo
 

1956 births
Living people
Coalition for Bulgaria MEPs
MEPs for Bulgaria 2007